The Pontifical Council Cor Unum for Human and Christian Development was a pontifical council of the Roman Curia of the Catholic Church from 1971 to 2016.

History 
The Pontifical Council was established by Pope Paul VI on 15 July 1971 and was based in the Palazzo San Callisto, on Piazza San Callisto, Rome.

Effective 1 January 2017, the work of the Council was assumed by the Dicastery for Promoting Integral Human Development, into which it was merged by Pope Francis.

Description 
The name of the pontifical council means "one heart", which Paul VI explained in 1972: "So we were able to give your ecclesial action for aid the name of one heart, a heart that beats in rhythm with the heart of Christ, whose pity for the hungry multitudes reaches them even in their spiritual hunger".

Its mission was "the care of the Catholic Church for the needy, thereby encouraging human fellowship and making manifest the charity of Christ", and it undertook this mission by carrying out humanitarian relief operations following disasters, fostering charity and encouraging cooperation and coordination of other Catholic organizations.

Officials

Presidents 
 Cardinal Jean Villot (15 July 1971 – 4 September 1978) (France)
 Cardinal Bernadin Gantin (4 September 1978 – 8 April 1984) (Benin)
 Cardinal Roger Etchegaray (8 April 1984 – 2 December 1995) (France)
 Cardinal Paul Josef Cordes (2 December 1995 – 7 October 2010) (Germany)
 Cardinal Robert Sarah (7 October 2010 – 24 November 2014) (Guinea)

Vice-Presidents 
 Bishop Ramón Torrella Cascante (1971.07.22 – 1975.12.20) (Spain)
 Cardinal Bernardin Gantin (1976 – 1978.09.04) (Benin)
 Archbishop Alfredo Bruniera (1978.11.06 – 1981) (Italy)
 Archbishop Alois Wagner (1981.10.12 – 1999.07.08) (Austria)

Secretaries 
 Father Henri de Riedmatten, O.P. (1971 – 1979) (Switzerland)
 Father Roger du Noyer, M.E.P. (1979 – 1988) (France)
 Iván Antonio Marín López (1992 – 1997.04.19) (Colombia)
 Monsignor Karel Kasteel (1998.03.28 – 2009.06.02) (Netherlands)
 Msgr. Giovanni Pietro Dal Toso (2010.06.22 – 2017.01.01) (Italy)

Under-Secretaries 
 Father Lajos Kada (1972 – 1975.06.20) (Hungary)
 Fr. Roger du Noyer, M.E.P. (1975 – 1979) (France)
 Fr. Henri Forest, S.J. (1979 – 1987) 
 Iván Antonio Marín López (1987 – 1992) (Colombia) 
 Monsignor Karel Kasteel (1992 – 1998.03.28) (Netherlands)
 Msgr. Francisco Azcona San Martín (1998 – 2003) (Spain)
 Msgr. Giovanni Pietro Dal Toso (2004.06.21 – 2010.06.22) (Italy)
 Msgr. Segundo Tejado Muñoz (2011.01.05 – 2017.01.01)

References

External links and sources 
 Pontifical Council Cor Unum 

 
Catholic social teaching
Cor Unum
Organisations based in Rome
Religious organisations based in Italy
Christian organizations established in 1971
Organizations disestablished in 2016
1971 in Vatican City
1971 establishments in Italy
2016 disestablishments in Italy
Former departments of the Roman Curia